Davis Correctional Facility is a 1600-bed, medium/ maximum security prison for men located in Holdenville, Oklahoma. It is owned and run by Corrections Corporation of America under contract with the Oklahoma Department of Corrections.

References  

Buildings and structures in Hughes County, Oklahoma
Prisons in Oklahoma
Private prisons in the United States
CoreCivic
1996 establishments in Oklahoma